Spiral is an album by jazz vibraphonist Bobby Hutcherson. It was released in 1979 on Blue Note Records (LT 996) featuring six tracks recorded in November, 1968, except for "Jasper", recorded in 1965 and later added to the CD reissue of Dialogue, since it was recorded the same day. The first five tracks of Spiral may also be found on the CD reissue of Medina.

Track listing
"Ruth" (Chambers) – 7:52
"The Wedding March" (Cowell) – 3:54
"Poor People's March" (Land) – 6:18
"Spiral" (Chambers) – 6:15
"Visions" (Hutcherson) – 3:50
"Jasper" (Andrew Hill) – 8:29

Personnel
Tracks 1–5
Bobby Hutcherson – vibraphone, marimba
Harold Land – saxophone
Stanley Cowell – piano
Reggie Johnson – bass
Joe Chambers – drums

Track 6
Bobby Hutcherson – vibraphone, marimba
Sam Rivers – tenor sax, bass clarinet
Freddie Hubbard – trumpet
Andrew Hill – piano
Richard Davis – bass
Joe Chambers – drums

References 

1979 albums
Blue Note Records albums
Bobby Hutcherson albums
Post-bop albums
Albums recorded at Van Gelder Studio
Albums produced by Francis Wolff
Albums produced by Duke Pearson